The Divorcée is a 1926 German silent film directed by Victor Janson and Rudolf Dworsky, starring Mady Christians, Marcella Albani, and Bruno Kastner. It is based on the operetta Die geschiedene Frau. It was shot at the Staaken Studios in Berlin. The film's sets were designed by the art director Jacek Rotmil.

Cast
Mady Christians as Gonda van der Loo
Marcella Albani as Jana
Bruno Kastner as Lucas van Deesteldonck
Victor Janson as Dr. Scrop
Paul Morgan as Erster Gerichtsdiener
Wilhelm Bendow as Zweiter Gerichtsdiener
Walter Rilla as Karel van Lysseweghe

See also
The Divorcée (1953)

References

External links

Films of the Weimar Republic
German silent feature films
Films directed by Rudolf Dworsky
Films directed by Victor Janson
Films set in the Netherlands
Rail transport films
Films about divorce
Films based on operettas
German black-and-white films
Films scored by Leo Fall
Films shot at Staaken Studios